Federal Route 265 is a federal road in Perlis, Malaysia. The roads connects Titi Tinggi in the east to Tasoh in the south. This section of road used to be part of Federal Route 7.

The Kilometre Zero is located at Titi Tinggi junctions

Features
At most sections, the Federal Route 265 was built under the JKR R5 road standard, allowing maximum speed limit of up to 90 km/h.

There are no overlaps, alternate routes, or sections with motorcycle lanes.

List of junctions and towns

References

Malaysian Federal Roads
Roads in Perlis